Petro Stebnytsky (1862–1923) was a Ukrainian political and public figure, diplomat and statesman.

He was a minister of education and arts in the Lyzohub Government, replacing Mykola Vasylenko.

External links
 Petro Stebnytsky at the Encyclopedia of Ukraine
 Horbach, T., Kupchenko-Hrynchuk, O. Petro Yanuariyovych Stebnytsky at the Vernadsky National Library of Ukraine
 Petro Stebnytsky at litopys.com.ua
 Petro Stebnytsky at the Ukrainians-world.org.ua

1862 births
1923 deaths
People from Kyiv Oblast
People from Kiev Governorate
Education ministers of Ukraine
Art ministers of Ukraine
Ukrainian Democratic Party (1904) politicians
20th-century Ukrainian politicians